The Ramat Gan Museum of Israeli Art is an art museum that displays Israeli art, located on Abba Hillel Street of Ramat Gan, Israel. The museum was opened on 4 April 1987.

History 
The building was built in the 1930s with the initial purpose of serving as an industrial plant. Prior to the opening of the museum, the building was converted into a museum space by architect Danny Schwarz, in order to serve its new purpose. In 2012, the museum had 23,000 visitors. The museum was closed for renovation in 2017 and reopened in 2021.

The museum has been showcasing eclectical exhibitions since the day of its opening. The current director is curator Meir Aharonson. Of the museum's most popular and prominent exhibitions, we can find photographer Simha Shimran's photography exhibition, curator Yehudit Mezkel's motherhood themed group exhibition, and more. As of 2022, the exhibitions include paintings, photographs, video, installation art and sculpture.

The museum found itself in the centre of controversy in 2021 when a painting which was deemed offensive to Haredi community was removed at the request of the mayor of Ramat Gan. Other artists whose works were displayed in the museum demanded that the museum remove their artworks, thus almost emptying the museum.

See also
List of Israeli museums
Israeli art

References

External links
Ramat Gan Museum of Israeli Art website

1987 establishments in Israel
Art museums and galleries in Israel